CJAS-FM is an English language community radio station that operates at 93.5 MHz (FM) in Saint-Augustin, Quebec, Canada.

Owned by La Radio communautaire de Rivière-Saint-Augustin, the station received CRTC approval in 1987.

References

External links
www.cjasradio.ca - CJAS Radio
 

Jas
Jas
Jas
Radio stations established in 1987
1987 establishments in Quebec
JAS-FM